Pearson Hall may refer to:

 Pearson PLC
 Pearson Hall (Miami University) in Ohio, United States
 Pearson Hall, Sonning, England